The Coeur d'Alene Casino is a Native American gaming enterprise run by the Coeur d'Alene people  on the Coeur d'Alene Reservation in Kootenai County, Idaho, United States, northwest of Worley. The Coeur d'Alene Casino is currently one of the largest employers in the Idaho region.

History
In 1992, the Coeur d'Alene people began the process of negotiating with the State of Idaho, inaugurating a bingo hall in 1993. The 20,000 square-feet property's initial cost was $2.7 million. The project was managed by chief executive officer Dave Matheson, who also served as tribal chairman and deputy commissioner of Indian Affairs during President George Bush Sr.'s administration.

In 1994, Matheson and eLottery Chairman Robert A. Berman initiated the National Indian Lottery on behalf of the Coeur d'Alene people. The project consisted of the first multi-state lottery and was aimed at generating funds to help develop the Coeur d’Alene casino.

In 1994, the National Indian Lottery received approval from the federal government. It initially operated via telephone sales, and later through the Internet. Robert A. Berman assisted in the development of the technology for the project that managed and monitored necessary security, age and border controls required to process lottery transactions. In 1996 the casino received a $14 million expansion, and by 1998 it made net profits that totaled $9.2 million. The National Indian Lottery concluded in 1998 after receiving opposition from Attorney general Skip Humphrey via the District Court for the District of Idaho.

The casino has since gone through various major expansions and renovations. Profits from the casino's revenues are invested back into the Coeur d'Alene community in areas of education and finance, including investments in property and land. In 2016, Francis SiJohn became the casino's new CEO.

Facilities
The Coeur d'Alene Casino includes 2,000 gaming machines (video poker, ShuffleMaster electronic tables, slots, and keno), a bingo hall, entertainment venues, retail areas, and multiple restaurants. It also includes a luxury hotel and the award-winning Circling Raven Golf Club.

See also

 List of casinos in Idaho
 List of casino hotels

References

External links

 

Casinos in Idaho
Casino hotels
Native American casinos
Buildings and structures in Kootenai County, Idaho
Native American history of Idaho